Broodmeester of Flanders or Pannetier de Flandre  (Master of the Bread / panetarius) was a feudal title, this hereditary title evolved in the Ancien Régime to a ceremonial function.

History 
The court had a few ceremonial functions, most known was the chamberlain, Bouteiller (buticularius), Standard-bearer, Woudmeester (Forestarius) and the Seneschal., less known was the Panetarius. This ceremonial function was reserved for an important family and was given from father to son by the Count of Flanders. In 1234 the Broodmeester was requested to attend the table of the Countess of Flanders. This function was paid and he received some privileges.

One of the titles that inherited this function was the Lord of Rode, later the Marquess of Rode.

A similar function existed at the court of the Duke of Burgundy and the King of France.

List of Broodmeesters

See 
 Grand Panetier of France
 Grand Huntsman of Brabant

References

Court titles in the Ancien Régime